Country Club Mall is a shopping mall located in LaVale, Maryland, a suburb of Cumberland, Maryland in Allegany County, Maryland. The mall has sixty retail units, as well as seven vendor stands on the main concourse. Located in the Country Club Mall is the Country Club Mall 8 Cinemas, the largest movie theater in Allegany County. The mall is managed by Namdar Realty Group. The mall's anchor stores are Ulta Beauty, Walmart Supercenter, Country Club Mall 8 Cinemas, and TJ Maxx. There are 3 vacant anchor stores that were once JCPenney, Sears and The Bon-Ton.

History
The mall was built after the state of Maryland spent $12 million on a road that facilitated the region's growth. This is believed to have led to the closings of smaller stores in Cumberland. The  property is a portion of a larger  parcel. Before 1979, most of the 
parcel, including portions of the  subject property, was used for strip mining and a golf
course. The strip mine was filled in 1979, and the shopping center was built in 1981. When the mall opened, it contained a Kmart, JCPenney and Eyerly's, which was eventually replaced by Bon-Ton. Sears opened about a year later, and Kmart closed in 2002 and was replaced by a Walmart Supercenter in 2004. On April 18, 2018, The Bon-Ton Stores announced it would close all stores, including the Bon-Ton store at Country Club Mall. The store closed on August 29, 2018. On November 7, 2019, it was announced that Sears would be closing this location a part of a plan to close 96 stores nationwide. The store closed in February 2020. On June 4, 2020, JCPenney announced that it would close by around October 2020 as part of a plan to close 154 stores nationwide. After JCPenney closed, TJ Maxx, Walmart Supercenter, and Country Club Mall 8 Cinemas are the only anchor stores left.

Management
The original owner of the mall was Andrew D. Gumberg of Gumberg Asset Management Corp, a Pittsburgh real estate company.
The Corporation, at the time called J. J. Gumberg Properties', purchased the Country Club Mall for $32.4 million in January 1999. Brad Kotz of KLNB Inc. represented the seller, Lend Lease Real Estate Investments, in the sale to J. J. Gumberg.

The new owners, who purchased the mall at auction, are the Namdar Realty Group and Mason Asset Management, both of Great Neck, New York. Namdar Realty will operate the mall while Mason Asset Management will oversee all leasing efforts.

Surrounding area
Country Club Mall is located in Allegany County in Western Maryland.  The mall attracts residents from numerous counties in Maryland, Pennsylvania and West Virginia. It is the only enclosed shopping mall within .  It is located right off of Interstate 68 on Vocke Road. The property is bound to the south and west by restaurants, hotels, and commercial establishments, and undeveloped land to the north and east.

Food court
Vendors in the food court include:
 Wasabi Steakhouse
 The Smoothie Grille
Auntie Anne’s

Movie theater

There is an eight-screen movie theater space at the mall.  Over time, the management of the theater has changed. AMC Theatres used to manage the theaters. Under AMC, the space was a six-screen movie theater and it was called AMC Country Club Mall 6.  AMC ended operation on July 17, 2011 after deciding not to renew the lease, which ended on July 31, 2011. Immediately after, WPA Theaters became the company managing the movie theater in early August 2011. The company increased the screen count to eight, and the theater's name changed to the current Country Club 8 Cinemas. WPA's plan was to keep the same staff and managers who worked at AMC.

Crime and incidents
 A man scammed a 71-year-old man out of an undisclosed amount of money at JC Penney's on May 14, 2012. The criminal posed as an undercover police officer and convinced the elderly man to give him money instead of going in front of a judge. Video surveillance caught the criminal's identity.
 A deer visited Barbara's Hallmark store on December 15, 2012.  No injuries were reported, but a few items got knocked down. Employees shut the front gate of the store to coax the deer to the back.  The deer left through the back door after a few minutes.

Public transportation
Allegany County Transit provides bus services to the mall.  Many of the lines stop by the mall and Walmart.  Morning service, Green, Gold, Purple, Evening Service have a destination at the mall.  Some buses for Frostburg State University bring students to the mall.

Notes

External links
Official website

Shopping malls in Maryland
Shopping malls established in 1981
Buildings and structures in Allegany County, Maryland
1981 establishments in Maryland